Sibrandabuorren is a village in Súdwest-Fryslân municipality in the province of Friesland, the Netherlands. It had a population of around 365 in January 2017.

History
The village was first mentioned in 1333 as "Zibrandus curatus in Zibrandaburghe", and means neighbourhood of Sibrand (person). Sibrandabuorren is a terp (artificial living hill) village from the middle ages located on the eastern side of the former Middelzee.

The Dutch Reformed church was built in 1872 as a replacement of a medieval church.

Sibrandabuorren was home to 155 people in 1840. During the 19th century, it extended into a linear settlement along the roads. In 1891, a dairy factory opened and remained in operation until 1975. The building is nowadays used by a stainless steel factory. Before 2011, the village was part of the Boarnsterhim municipality and before 1984 it belonged to Rauwerdhem municipality.

References

Súdwest-Fryslân
Populated places in Friesland